The Ireland A cricket team toured Sri Lanka to play 2 first-class matches and 5 List-A matches against Sri Lanka A cricket team Ahead of the First-class series Ireland Wolves team also played a two-day warm-up match against a Sri Lanka Board Presidents XI.

Tour Match

Two-day : Sri Lanka Board President XI v/s Ireland Wolves

First-Class series

1st Unofficial Test

2nd Unofficial Test

List A Series

1st Unofficial ODI

2nd Unofficial ODI

3rd Unofficial ODI

4th Unofficial ODI

5th Unofficial ODI

References

Sri
Ireland
Irish cricket tours of Sri Lanka
International cricket tours of Sri Lanka